"2step" is a song by English singer-songwriter Ed Sheeran from his fifth studio album = (2021), appearing as the ninth track on its track listing. It was written by Sheeran, David Hodges, Louis Bell and Andrew Wotman, and produced by the latter two. A remix featuring American rapper Lil Baby was released on 22 April 2022, making it the fifth and final single from the album. It was sent to hot adult contemporary radio in the United States three days later. On 2 May 2022, Sheeran released a version of the song featuring Ukrainian pop-rock band Antytila, and later released an additional 12 "global remixes" of the song, with artists from Finland, India, Italy, Sweden, Spain, Australia, France, the United Kingdom, Ireland, and Brazil.

Background
Sheeran said that he wrote this song from the "lowest point of confidence" telling Dev: "Every song I did, I would send in and just get a lukewarm reaction. I went into the studio and just wrote about being really low on confidence and I think that's probably one of my favorite songs on the album.

Promotion and release
On 19 August 2021, Sheeran announced his fifth studio album, = in which the song is listed number ninth on the tracklist. On 29 October 2021, "2step" was released alongside other album tracks that appeared on the album =.

Lyric video
A lyric video for the song was uploaded on Sheeran's YouTube account on 29 October 2021 along with the other lyric videos of the songs that appeared on the tracklisting of =.

Music video
The music video for the song, filmed in Kyiv, Ukraine and directed by Henry Scholfield, was uploaded to YouTube on 22 April 2022. The video was filmed prior to the February 2022 invasion, and all revenue from YouTube streams are earmarked for Ukraine.

Track listing
Digital download, streaming and CD – Single
"2step" (featuring Lil Baby) – 2:43

Digital download and streaming – The Remixes
"2step" (featuring Lil Baby) – 2:43
"2step" (featuring Ultimo) – 2:34
"2step" (featuring Potter Payper) – 2:33
"2step" (featuring Antytila) – 2:33
"2step" (featuring Leto) – 2:34
"2step" (featuring Ellinoora) – 2:33
"2step" (featuring 1.Cuz) – 2:33
"2step" (featuring Budjerah) – 2:33
"2step" (Star.One Remix) – 3:25
"2step" (featuring Chefin) – 2:44
"2step" (featuring reezy) – 2:33
"2step" (featuring Quevedo) – 2:33
"2step" (featuring Denise Chaila) – 2:33

Digital download and streaming – Single
"2step" (featuring Armaan Malik) – 2:33

Credits and personnel
 Ed Sheeran – vocals, guitar, production, songwriting, writing
 David Hodges – production, songwriting, writing
 Louis Bell – drums, keyboards, production, programming
 Andrew Watt – guitar, keyboards, production, programming
 Stuart Hawkes – mastering
 Mark "Spike" Stent – mixing
 Paul LaMalfa – engineering

Charts

Weekly charts

Monthly charts

Year-end charts

Certifications

Release history

References

2022 songs
2022 singles
Ed Sheeran songs
Lil Baby songs
Number-one singles in Sweden
Songs written by Ed Sheeran
Songs written by Lil Baby
Songs written by David Hodges
Songs written by Louis Bell
Songs written by Andrew Watt (record producer)
Asylum Records singles
Atlantic Records singles
Songs about the 2022 Russian invasion of Ukraine
Music videos shot in Ukraine